The Ocean and the Sun is the third album by experimental rock band The Sound of Animals Fighting. The album features only the four core members that had appeared on both the first and second albums: the Nightingale, the Walrus, the Lynx and The Skunk.

The first song, "Intro", is the Persian translation of the English poem "In the Desert" by Stephen Crane. The original (English) version of this poem is printed on the inside jacket of the album. It is also read in English on the eleventh track.
The title of the final track, "On the Occasion of Wet Snow", is the title of the second section of Fyodor Dostoevsky's Notes from Underground. The second song, "The Ocean and the Sun", features a reading from the CrimethInc. book Days of War, Nights of Love.
The title of the seventh track, "The Heraldic Beak of the Manufacturer's Medallion", is taken from J. G. Ballard's Crash.

The album peaked at 141 on the Billboard 200 and number 2 on the Top Heatseekers chart.

Track listing

Credits
 Rich Balling - vocals, executive producer
 Matthew Embree - guitar, bass, vocals, producer, engineer, mixer
 Christopher Tsagakis - drums
 Anthony Green - vocals
 Matthew Kelly - featured on "On the Occasion of Wet Snow"
 Adrian, Elaina, and Victoria Benson - kids
 Mark Bush - trumpet
 Lauren Coleman - vocals/spoken word
 Jessica McWhirter - vocals
 Newsha Mohajeri - Persian poem
 Charlene Rogers - spoken word on "Ahab"
 Edouard Wlodarczyk - French poem
 Wes Irving - assistant engineer
 David Embree - assistant engineer, co-production on "Uzbekistan"
 Austin Johnson - assistant engineer
 Charles Johnson-Nunez - assistant engineer
 Stephanie Villa - mastering

References

External links
 Track By Track guide from The Nightingale on Rockmidgets.com
 Epitaph Page

The Sound of Animals Fighting albums
2008 albums
Epitaph Records albums